Ralph Richter is a pioneering American gasser drag racer. He was the first National Hot Rod Association (NHRA) two-time national class champion, in 1955 and 1956.

History 
Driving a 1955 Porsche, Richter won NHRA's first ever B/SP national title, at Great Bend, Kansas, in 1955. (His elapsed time was not recorded or has not been preserved.)

Richter repeated with a win in B/SP at Kansas City, Missouri in 1956, driving a 1956 MGA.  He recorded a pass of 20.13 seconds at 

By winning two titles, Richter became NHRA's first two-time national class champion.  He was first to achieve it in B/SP.

Notes

Sources
Davis, Larry. Gasser Wars, North Branch, MN:  Cartech, 2003, p. 180.

Dragster drivers
American racing drivers